Human Highway is a 1982 American comedy film starring and co-directed by Neil Young under his pseudonym Bernard Shakey.  Dean Stockwell co-directed the film and acted along with Russ Tamblyn, Dennis Hopper, and the band Devo. Included is a collaborative performance of "Hey Hey, My My (Into the Black)" by Devo and Young with Booji Boy singing lead vocals and Young playing lead guitar.

The film was shown in only select theaters and was not released on VHS until 1995. It received poor reviews upon its premiere but has received favorable reviews more recently.

Plot
Employees and customers spend time at a small gas station-diner in a fictional town next to a nuclear power plant unaware it is the last day on Earth. Young Otto Quartz has received ownership of the failing business in his recently deceased father's will. His employee, Lionel Switch, is the garage's goofy and bumbling auto mechanic who dreams of being a rock star. "I can do it!" Lionel often exclaims. After some modest character development and a collage-like dream sequence there is a tongue-in-cheek choreographed musical finale while nuclear war begins.

At the destroyed gas station-diner post nuclear holocaust, Booji Boy is the lone survivor, but after his cynical prose the opening credits are a return to present time prior to apocalypse. [Some edits of the film place this scene at the end, including the most recent Director's Cut.]

At the nuclear power plant nuclear garbage men (members of Devo) reveal that radioactive waste is routinely mishandled and dumped at the nearby town of Linear Valley. They sing a remake of "Worried Man Blues" while loading waste barrels on an old truck. Meanwhile, Lionel and his buddy Fred Kelly (Russ Tamblyn) ride bicycles to work. Fred states that Old Otto's recent death was by radiation poisoning. They remain unaware of the implications as Lionel laments it should have been himself that died because he has worked on "almost every radiator in every car in town."

Early in the day at the diner Young Otto announces he must fire an employee for lack of money. He chooses waitress Kathryn, who has a tantrum and refuses to leave. She sits down weeping at a booth that has a picture on the wall of Old Otto and chooses on the juke box the song "The End of the World". Later, waitress Irene, overhears Young Otto's plans to fire everybody, destroy the buildings and collect on a fraud insurance claim. Irene demands to be included in the scheme and to seal the deal with a kiss.

Although Lionel has a crush on the waitress Charlotte Goodnight, she has a crush on the milkman Earl Duke. After an earthquake Duke, dressed in white, enters the diner with a delivery. He flirts with her saying, "Charlotte ...on my way over here this morning I thought about you and the earth moved." She replies, "You felt it too!" He also offers her a milk bath. While he is there a dining Arab sheik offers him wealth in return for his "whiteness."

A limousine stops at the gas station. After Lionel learns his rock star idol, Frankie Fontaine, is in the limousine he insists the vehicle will need work. After meeting rock star Frankie, who appears to lead an opulent, sequestered and drug influenced life-style, Lionel says to the wooden Indian in his shop, "Now there's a real human being!"

Lionel receives a bump on the head while working on Frankie's limousine and enters a dream. He becomes a rock star with a backup band of wooden Indians. Back stage he is given a milk bath by Irene. Lionel travels with his band (the wooden Indians) and crew (all people from his waking life) by trucks through the desert. The wooden Indians become missing.

During "Goin' Back" (a song by Young) the entourage recreates in the desert near a Pueblo. Native Americans prepare a bonfire to burn the wooden Indians which had been missing. Soon Lionel is playing music and dancing around the bonfire which appears to have become the center of a Pow-wow. "Goin' Back" ends gazing into the bonfire of burning wooden Indians. "Hey, Hey, My, My" is a ten-minute studio jam performance of Devo and Young.

Lionel wakes from his dream surrounded by concerned friends much like Dorothy in The Wizard of Oz. Soon there is the start of global nuclear war. No one is sure what is happening until it is announced by Booji Boy, as "the hour of sleep." He then provides shovels and commands everyone to "dig that hole and dance like a mole!" The cast then enters a choreographed adaptation of "Worried Man". The planet is engulfed in radioactive glow and the cast, still festive, climbs a stairway to heaven accompanied by harp music.

Cast
The cast in credit order includes Neil Young as "Lionel Switch", the garage mechanic, Russ Tamblyn as "Fred Kelly" who is Lionel's friend, Dean Stockwell as "Otto Quartz", the restaurant and gas station owner and Dennis Hopper as the cook, "Cracker". The waitresses were Charlotte Stewart as "Charlotte",  Sally Kirkland as "Kathryn" and Geraldine Baron as "Irene". Several of the cast members became favorites of David Lynch. The members of Devo were cast as "Nuclear Garbagepersons". The film was released shortly after the death of 1960s folk-singer David Blue who was cast as the milkman, "Earl Duke".

Production
Over four years Young spent $3 million of his own money on production. Filming began in 1978 in San Francisco and Taos, New Mexico. It was resumed in 1981 on the Hollywood soundstages of Raleigh Studios. The set which included the diner and gas station was built to Young's specific requests. His initial idea was to portray a day in the life of Lionel and bystanders during the Earth's last day. The actors were to develop their own characters. The script was a combination of improvisation and developing small story lines as they went. Young, Stockwell and Tamblyn were central in the writing.

Dennis Hopper, who played the addled cook, was performing knife tricks with a real knife on the set. Sally Kirkland attempted to take a knife from him, and severed a tendon. She spent time in a hospital and later sued, claiming Hopper was out of control. Hopper has admitted to drug abuse during this time period.

For Devo it was their first experience with Hollywood. Gerald Casale said the band felt removed observing the odd behaviors including excessive alcohol and drug abuse and rock star adulation with Young as the central "most grounded" person.

The "Hey Hey My My" footage with Devo was recorded at Different Fur, San Francisco. Mark Mothersbaugh as "Booji Boy" during this performance inserted the Devo line, "rust never sleeps". The line would soon after become the inspiration for Young's works with the same name. Young showed the footage of this performance to his band Crazy Horse. Guitarist Frank Sampedro has said they played "Hey Hey My My" "harder" as a result.

Credits
Editing and post-production supervision is credited to James Beshears (Madagascar, Shark Tale, Shrek). The screen play is credited to Bernard Shakey, Jeanne Field, Dean Stockwell, Russ Tamblyn and Beshears. The members of Devo were asked to write their own parts. Choreography is credited to Tamblyn. Music is credited to Neil Young and Devo. The film's score was the first by Mark Mothersbaugh (Rugrats, Nick and Norah's Infinite Playlist, Herbie: Fully Loaded, Rushmore, The Royal Tenenbaums, The Lego Movie), who also portrays Booji Boy and a nuclear garbage man. Most of the songs by Young in the film would be released on the album Trans.

Release

Critical reception
Human Highway is commonly reviewed as a "bizarre" comedy.  Following  the film's official premiere in Los Angeles, June 1983, it was shown only briefly in a small number of theaters. It received poor reviews by critics and confused audiences. After the film's release to VHS in 1996 it has since received more favorable reviews such as being described by TV Guide as "goofy and enjoyable" and Young's acting as "surprisingly funny." It was also suggested by TV Guide that the film would have done well on the midnight circuit that existed at the time of its initial release. Yet, a critic of cult films reviewed the film as being self-absorbed and worthwhile only for completists. An original intent by Young to reference the dream-plot of The Wizard of Oz has been recognized in a Rotten Tomatoes synopsis describing the film as "The Wizard of Oz on acid." A more recent review by Seattle Times critic Tom Keogh notes the film's use of "hyper-real sets" predating Tim Burton and a surety of direction at times recognizably influenced by Paul Morrissey and John Waters.

Home video
The film was only released in a VHS fullscreen edition (as well as LaserDisc) by WEA in 1995, twelve years after its initial screening. A DVD and Blu-Ray of Neil's "Directors Cut" was released July 22, 2016, alongside a DVD and Blu-Ray release of the Rust Never Sleeps concert film.  It was a different edit than the theatrical release. The dream sequence originally featured a concert version of "Ride My Llama", while the 1995 version replaced it with the album version of "Goin' Back". Several scenes from the movie appeared on the Devo music video collections We're All Devo and The Complete Truth About Devolution, and were edited to appear as one continuous video for the song "Worried Man".

References

External links
 

1982 films
American rock music films
American musical comedy films
Devo
Films directed by Dean Stockwell
Films directed by Neil Young
1980s English-language films
1980s American films